Rajaparambara is a 1977 Indian Malayalam film, directed by Dr. Balakrishnan and produced by M. P. Bhaskaran. The film stars Vincent, Jayan, Jayabharathi, Jose Prakash and Shobha in the lead roles. The film has musical score by A. T. Ummer.

Cast

Jayan
Jayabharathi
Jose Prakash
Shobha
Raghavan
Kuthiravattam Pappu
Reena
Sudheer
Vincent

Soundtrack
The music was composed by A. T. Ummer and the lyrics were written by Appan Thacheth, Bharanikkavu Sivakumar and Bichu Thirumala.

References

External links
 

1977 films
1970s Malayalam-language films